The 1958 Pittsburgh Pirates season was the 77th season of the Pittsburgh Pirates franchise; the 72nd in the National League. They ended the year in the first division for the first time since  and recorded their highest league standing since the  edition also finished in second place. Manager Danny Murtaugh, in his first full season at the Pirates' helm, was voted Major League Manager of the Year by The Sporting News.

Offseason 
 December 2, 1957: Ellis Burton was drafted from the Pirates by the St. Louis Cardinals in the 1957 minor league draft.
 December 28, 1957: Dee Fondy was traded by the Pirates to the Cincinnati Redlegs for Ted Kluszewski.

Regular season

Season standings

Record vs. opponents

Game log

|- bgcolor="ccffcc"
| 1 || April 15 || @ Braves || 4–3 (14) || Blackburn (1–0) || Conley || Raydon (1) || 43,339 || 1–0
|- bgcolor="ffbbbb"
| 2 || April 17 || @ Braves || 1–6 || Burdette || Law (0–1) || — || 12,854 || 1–1
|- bgcolor="ffbbbb"
| 3 || April 18 || Redlegs || 1–4 || Purkey || Kline (0–1) || Jeffcoat || 34,032 || 1–2
|- bgcolor="ffbbbb"
| 4 || April 19 || Redlegs || 6–9 || Haddix || Smith (0–1) || Jeffcoat || 12,171 || 1–3
|- bgcolor="ccffcc"
| 5 || April 20 || Redlegs || 4–3 || Friend (1–0) || Schmidt || — || 15,142 || 2–3
|- bgcolor="ffbbbb"
| 6 || April 22 || Braves || 2–5 || Buhl || Kline (0–2) || — || 6,991 || 2–4
|- bgcolor="ffbbbb"
| 7 || April 23 || @ Phillies || 1–8 || Sanford || Blackburn (1–1) || — || 7,668 || 2–5
|- bgcolor="ccffcc"
| 8 || April 24 || @ Phillies || 7–4 || Friend (2–0) || Simmons || Face (1) || 7,456 || 3–5
|- bgcolor="ccffcc"
| 9 || April 25 || @ Redlegs || 4–3 || Law (1–1) || Haddix || Face (2) || 7,744 || 4–5
|- bgcolor="ccffcc"
| 10 || April 26 || @ Redlegs || 8–4 || Gross (1–0) || Rabe || — || 3,291 || 5–5
|- bgcolor="ccffcc"
| 11 || April 29 || @ Dodgers || 7–1 || Friend (3–0) || Erskine || — || 19,778 || 6–5
|- bgcolor="ccffcc"
| 12 || April 30 || @ Dodgers || 3–1 || Kline (1–2) || Drysdale || — || 13,890 || 7–5
|-

|- bgcolor="ccffcc"
| 13 || May 1 || @ Dodgers || 8–3 || Law (2–1) || Newcombe || Blackburn (1) || 16,503 || 8–5
|- bgcolor="ffbbbb"
| 14 || May 2 || @ Dodgers || 5–9 || Podres || Perez (0–1) || Labine || 22,940 || 8–6
|- bgcolor="ccffcc"
| 15 || May 3 || @ Dodgers || 3–1 || Friend (4–0) || Kipp || Face (3) || 16,288 || 9–6
|- bgcolor="ccffcc"
| 16 || May 4 || @ Giants || 6–2 || Kline (2–2) || Antonelli || Face (4) ||  || 10–6
|- bgcolor="ffbbbb"
| 17 || May 4 || @ Giants || 3–4 (10) || Worthington || Face (0–1) || — || 22,721 || 10–7
|- bgcolor="ccffcc"
| 18 || May 5 || @ Giants || 11–10 || Law (3–1) || Gomez || Gross (1) || 5,506 || 11–7
|- bgcolor="ffbbbb"
| 19 || May 6 || @ Giants || 0–7 || McCormick || Daniels (0–1) || — || 10,849 || 11–8
|- bgcolor="ffbbbb"
| 20 || May 7 || @ Giants || 6–8 || Worthington || Friend (4–1) || Grissom || 8,052 || 11–9
|- bgcolor="ccffcc"
| 21 || May 9 || Phillies || 1–0 (12) || Kline (3–2) || Roberts || — || 21,304 || 12–9
|- bgcolor="ccffcc"
| 22 || May 10 || Phillies || 14–4 || Law (4–1) || Semproch || — || 11,807 || 13–9
|- bgcolor="ccffcc"
| 23 || May 11 || Phillies || 10–4 || Friend (5–1) || Sanford || — ||  || 14–9
|- bgcolor="ccffcc"
| 24 || May 11 || Phillies || 1–0 (11) || Porterfield (1–0) || Simmons || — || 20,544 || 15–9
|- bgcolor="ccffcc"
| 25 || May 13 || Redlegs || 6–3 || Kline (4–2) || Lawrence || Gross (2) || 24,123 || 16–9
|- bgcolor="ccffcc"
| 26 || May 14 || Redlegs || 5–4 || Law (5–1) || Rabe || — || 24,102 || 17–9
|- bgcolor="ffbbbb"
| 27 || May 15 || Redlegs || 4–9 || Klippstein || Friend (5–2) || Jeffcoat || 12,022 || 17–10
|- bgcolor="ffbbbb"
| 28 || May 16 || @ Phillies || 2–6 || Simmons || Porterfield (1–1) || — || 12,401 || 17–11
|- bgcolor="ffbbbb"
| 29 || May 17 || @ Phillies || 3–4 || Roberts || Daniels (0–2) || — || 6,262 || 17–12
|- bgcolor="ffbbbb"
| 30 || May 18 || @ Phillies || 4–6 || Sanford || Kline (4–3) || Farrell ||  || 17–13
|- bgcolor="ffbbbb"
| 31 || May 18 || @ Phillies || 2–6 || Semproch || Law (5–2) || — || 19,068 || 17–14
|- bgcolor="ccffcc"
| 32 || May 20 || Cubs || 12–3 || Friend (6–2) || Drott || — || 15,848 || 18–14
|- bgcolor="ffbbbb"
| 33 || May 21 || Cubs || 1–5 || Phillips || Porterfield (1–2) || — || 5,393 || 18–15
|- bgcolor="ccffcc"
| 34 || May 23 || Cardinals || 3–2 || Kline (5–3) || Mizell || Gross (3) || 29,369 || 19–15
|- bgcolor="ccffcc"
| 35 || May 24 || Cardinals || 6–1 || Friend (7–2) || Jackson || — || 13,330 || 20–15
|- bgcolor="ffbbbb"
| 36 || May 25 || Giants || 2–5 || Gomez || Law (5–3) || — ||  || 20–16
|- bgcolor="ffbbbb"
| 37 || May 25 || Giants || 1–6 || Monzant || Raydon (0–1) || — || 35,797 || 20–17
|- bgcolor="ccffcc"
| 38 || May 27 || Dodgers || 5–3 || Kline (6–3) || Drysdale || Blackburn (2) || 15,705 || 21–17
|- bgcolor="ffbbbb"
| 39 || May 28 || Dodgers || 1–7 || Koufax || Friend (7–3) || — || 14,320 || 21–18
|- bgcolor="ffbbbb"
| 40 || May 30 || Braves || 4–7 || McMahon || Face (0–2) || Trowbridge ||  || 21–19
|- bgcolor="ccffcc"
| 41 || May 30 || Braves || 12–6 || Gross (2–0) || Robinson || — || 32,428 || 22–19
|- bgcolor="ffbbbb"
| 42 || May 31 || Braves || 3–8 || Spahn || Kline (6–4) || — || 17,596 || 22–20
|-

|- bgcolor="ccffcc"
| 43 || June 1 || Braves || 5–1 (8) || Friend (8–3) || Conley || — || 17,485 || 23–20
|- bgcolor="ffbbbb"
| 44 || June 2 || @ Redlegs || 2–8 || Nuxhall || Smith (0–2) || — || 2,827 || 23–21
|- bgcolor="ffbbbb"
| 45 || June 3 || @ Cardinals || 4–8 || Jackson || Raydon (0–2) || — || 11,465 || 23–22
|- bgcolor="ffbbbb"
| 46 || June 4 || @ Cardinals || 3–6 || Brosnan || Kline (6–5) || Muffett || 12,264 || 23–23
|- bgcolor="ffbbbb"
| 47 || June 5 || @ Cardinals || 3–4 || Mizell || Friend (8–4) || — || 7,570 || 23–24
|- bgcolor="ffbbbb"
| 48 || June 6 || @ Cubs || 1–6 || Drott || Law (5–4) || — || 4,567 || 23–25
|- bgcolor="ccffcc"
| 49 || June 7 || @ Cubs || 8–6 (10) || Face (1–2) || Nichols || Smith (1) || 14,487 || 24–25
|- bgcolor="ffbbbb"
| 50 || June 8 || @ Cubs || 0–4 || Drabowsky || Kline (6–6) || — || 15,670 || 24–26
|- bgcolor="ccffcc"
| 51 || June 10 || @ Giants || 5–4 || Friend (9–4) || Monzant || — || 16,621 || 25–26
|- bgcolor="ccffcc"
| 52 || June 11 || @ Giants || 14–6 || Law (6–4) || Gomez || Face (5) || 7,912 || 26–26
|- bgcolor="ccffcc"
| 53 || June 12 || @ Giants || 2–1 || Raydon (1–2) || Giel || — || 9,273 || 27–26
|- bgcolor="ffbbbb"
| 54 || June 13 || @ Dodgers || 4–5 || Labine || Kline (6–7) || — || 27,748 || 27–27
|- bgcolor="ffbbbb"
| 55 || June 14 || @ Dodgers || 2–4 || Podres || Friend (9–5) || — || 35,345 || 27–28
|- bgcolor="ccffcc"
| 56 || June 15 || @ Dodgers || 12–1 || Law (7–4) || Newcombe || — || 30,752 || 28–28
|- bgcolor="ccffcc"
| 57 || June 17 || Giants || 6–1 || Raydon (2–2) || Antonelli || Face (6) || 27,763 || 29–28
|- bgcolor="ffbbbb"
| 58 || June 18 || Giants || 1–2 (10) || Giel || Friend (9–6) || Grissom || 21,512 || 29–29
|- bgcolor="ccffcc"
| 59 || June 19 || Giants || 6–5 || Kline (7–7) || Worthington || Gross (4) || 8,474 || 30–29
|- bgcolor="ccffcc"
| 60 || June 20 || Dodgers || 2–1 || Witt (1–0) || Koufax || — || 21,614 || 31–29
|- bgcolor="ccffcc"
| 61 || June 21 || Dodgers || 11–7 || Face (2–2) || Roebuck || — || 6,633 || 32–29
|- bgcolor="ffbbbb"
| 62 || June 22 || Dodgers || 1–4 || Kipp || Friend (9–7) || Klippstein ||  || 32–30
|- bgcolor="ffbbbb"
| 63 || June 22 || Dodgers || 2–3 (10) || Koufax || Porterfield (1–3) || — || 30,109 || 32–31
|- bgcolor="ffbbbb"
| 64 || June 23 || Cardinals || 5–7 || Brosnan || Gross (2–1) || Jackson || 13,529 || 32–32
|- bgcolor="ffbbbb"
| 65 || June 24 || Cardinals || 1–2 || Paine || Kline (7–8) || — || 15,899 || 32–33
|- bgcolor="ffbbbb"
| 66 || June 25 || Cardinals || 1–3 || Mizell || Witt (1–1) || — || 15,375 || 32–34
|- bgcolor="ffbbbb"
| 67 || June 26 || Cardinals || 2–6 || McDaniel || Law (7–5) || Jackson || 5,048 || 32–35
|- bgcolor="ffbbbb"
| 68 || June 27 || Cubs || 1–3 || Drabowsky || Friend (9–8) || Henry || 17,026 || 32–36
|- bgcolor="ccffcc"
| 69 || June 28 || Cubs || 7–3 || Raydon (3–2) || Drott || Porterfield (1) || 8,413 || 33–36
|- bgcolor="ccffcc"
| 70 || June 29 || Cubs || 4–3 || Face (3–2) || Phillips || — ||  || 34–36
|- bgcolor="ffbbbb"
| 71 || June 29 || Cubs || 3–8 || Briggs || Gross (2–2) || Henry || 28,968 || 34–37
|-

|- bgcolor="ffbbbb"
| 72 || July 1 || Phillies || 2–4 || Semproch || Friend (9–9) || — || 17,990 || 34–38
|- bgcolor="ccffcc"
| 73 || July 3 || @ Redlegs || 2–0 || Witt (2–1) || Nuxhall || Face (7) || 11,707 || 35–38
|- bgcolor="ffbbbb"
| 74 || July 4 || @ Redlegs || 3–4 || Kellner || Kline (7–9) || — ||  || 35–39
|- bgcolor="ffbbbb"
| 75 || July 4 || @ Redlegs || 3–8 || Purkey || Law (7–6) || — || 15,999 || 35–40
|- bgcolor="ccffcc"
| 76 || July 5 || @ Braves || 4–2 || Friend (10–9) || Burdette || Face (8) || 23,833 || 36–40
|- bgcolor="ffbbbb"
| 77 || July 6 || @ Braves || 0–2 || Jay || Raydon (3–3) || — || 26,288 || 36–41
|- bgcolor="ffbbbb"
| 78 || July 10 || @ Cubs || 7–8 || Phillips || Law (7–7) || Henry || 35,000 || 36–42
|- bgcolor="ccffcc"
| 79 || July 11 || @ Cubs || 7–2 || Kline (8–9) || Drabowsky || — || 8,070 || 37–42
|- bgcolor="ffbbbb"
| 80 || July 12 || @ Cardinals || 0–2 || Mizell || Friend (10–10) || — || 12,956 || 37–43
|- bgcolor="ccffcc"
| 81 || July 13 || @ Cardinals || 10–8 || Blackburn (2–1) || Jackson || Law (1) || 27,844 || 38–43
|- bgcolor="ccffcc"
| 82 || July 13 || @ Cardinals || 8–6 || Law (8–7) || Stobbs || — || 27,844 || 39–43
|- bgcolor="ccffcc"
| 83 || July 15 || @ Dodgers || 6–2 || Kline (9–9) || Drysdale || Gross (5) || 20,827 || 40–43
|- bgcolor="ccffcc"
| 84 || July 16 || @ Dodgers || 7–4 || Friend (11–10) || Kipp || Face (9) || 19,706 || 41–43
|- bgcolor="ffbbbb"
| 85 || July 17 || @ Dodgers || 3–5 || Williams || Witt (2–2) || Labine || 18,677 || 41–44
|- bgcolor="ffbbbb"
| 86 || July 18 || @ Giants || 4–5 || Miller || Law (8–8) || Grissom || 22,770 || 41–45
|- bgcolor="ffbbbb"
| 87 || July 19 || @ Giants || 4–5 || Monzant || Porterfield (1–4) || Antonelli || 19,685 || 41–46
|- bgcolor="ffbbbb"
| 88 || July 20 || @ Giants || 3–7 || Giel || Friend (11–11) || Gomez || 22,814 || 41–47
|- bgcolor="ccffcc"
| 89 || July 23 || Dodgers || 11–3 || Kline (10–9) || Williams || — ||  || 42–47
|- bgcolor="ccffcc"
| 90 || July 23 || Dodgers || 6–3 || Friend (12–11) || Labine || Face (10) || 18,938 || 43–47
|- bgcolor="ccffcc"
| 91 || July 24 || Dodgers || 5–3 || Witt (3–2) || Williams || Face (11) || 7,437 || 44–47
|- bgcolor="ccffcc"
| 92 || July 25 || Giants || 10–0 || Raydon (4–3) || Miller || — || 30,545 || 45–47
|- bgcolor="ffbbbb"
| 93 || July 26 || Giants || 0–1 || Antonelli || Law (8–9) || Grissom || 15,549 || 45–48
|- bgcolor="ccffcc"
| 94 || July 27 || Giants || 2–1 (14) || Gross (3–2) || Monzant || — ||  || 46–48
|- bgcolor="ccffcc"
| 95 || July 27 || Giants || 4–3 || Porterfield (2–4) || Giel || — || 31,718 || 47–48
|- bgcolor="ccffcc"
| 96 || July 29 || Cubs || 6–4 || Friend (13–11) || Briggs || Face (12) || 20,325 || 48–48
|- bgcolor="ccffcc"
| 97 || July 30 || Cubs || 7–1 (8) || Witt (4–2) || Phillips || Porterfield (2) || 20,869 || 49–48
|- bgcolor="ffbbbb"
| 98 || July 31 || Cubs || 4–5 (8) || Hobbie || Gross (3–3) || Henry || 13,060 || 49–49
|-

|- bgcolor="ccffcc"
| 99 || August 1 || Cardinals || 2–0 || Kline (11–9) || Mabe || — || 27,862 || 50–49
|- bgcolor="ccffcc"
| 100 || August 2 || Cardinals || 1–0 || Law (9–9) || Jones || — || 15,028 || 51–49
|- bgcolor="ccffcc"
| 101 || August 3 || Cardinals || 2–0 || Friend (14–11) || Maglie || — ||  || 52–49
|- bgcolor="ccffcc"
| 102 || August 3 || Cardinals || 2–1 || Witt (5–2) || Mizell || — ||  || 53–49
|- bgcolor="ccffcc"
| 103 || August 4 || @ Braves || 4–3 || Raydon (5–3) || Pizarro || Face (13) || 24,096 || 54–49
|- bgcolor="ffbbbb"
| 104 || August 5 || @ Braves || 1–6 || Burdette || Kline (11–10) || — || 25,545 || 54–50
|- bgcolor="ffbbbb"
| 105 || August 6 || @ Braves || 1–2 || Willey || Law (9–10) || — || 28,760 || 54–51
|- bgcolor="ffbbbb"
| 106 || August 7 || @ Braves || 2–3 || Spahn || Friend (14–12) || — || 24,525 || 54–52
|- bgcolor="ccffcc"
| 107 || August 8 || Redlegs || 1–0 || Witt (6–2) || Nuxhall || — || 26,040 || 55–52
|- bgcolor="ccffcc"
| 108 || August 9 || Redlegs || 5–2 || Raydon (6–3) || Kellner || Face (14) || 13,122 || 56–52
|- bgcolor="ccffcc"
| 109 || August 10 || Redlegs || 3–2 (10) || Gross (4–3) || Jeffcoat || — ||  || 57–52
|- bgcolor="ccffcc"
| 110 || August 10 || Redlegs || 4–3 || Face (4–2) || Lawrence || — || 26,426 || 58–52
|- bgcolor="ccffcc"
| 111 || August 11 || Braves || 6–4 || Friend (15–12) || Spahn || Face (15) || 38,938 || 59–52
|- bgcolor="ccffcc"
| 112 || August 12 || Braves || 10–0 || Witt (7–2) || Rush || — || 36,867 || 60–52
|- bgcolor="ccffcc"
| 113 || August 13 || @ Phillies || 10–9 || Smith (1–2) || Meyer || Law (2) || 19,132 || 61–52
|- bgcolor="ffbbbb"
| 114 || August 15 || @ Redlegs || 1–6 || Purkey || Kline (11–11) || — || 11,277 || 61–53
|- bgcolor="ccffcc"
| 115 || August 16 || @ Redlegs || 13–4 || Friend (16–12) || Lawrence || Porterfield (3) || 9,564 || 62–53
|- bgcolor="ffbbbb"
| 116 || August 17 || @ Redlegs || 3–4 || Acker || Porterfield (2–5) || — ||  || 62–54
|- bgcolor="ffbbbb"
| 117 || August 17 || @ Redlegs || 5–7 || Nuxhall || Gross (4–4) || Newcombe || 17,416 || 62–55
|- bgcolor="ccffcc"
| 118 || August 19 || @ Cubs || 4–3 || Raydon (7–3) || Phillips || Porterfield (4) || 12,929 || 63–55
|- bgcolor="ccffcc"
| 119 || August 20 || @ Cubs || 4–2 || Kline (12–11) || Hillman || Face (16) ||  || 64–55
|- bgcolor="ffbbbb"
| 120 || August 20 || @ Cubs || 1–5 (5) || Drott || Friend (16–13) || — || 20,974 || 64–56
|- bgcolor="ffbbbb"
| 121 || August 21 || @ Cubs || 3–5 || Drabowsky || Law (9–11) || Hobbie || 10,027 || 64–57
|- bgcolor="ccffcc"
| 122 || August 22 || @ Cubs || 8–2 || Witt (8–2) || Solis || Law (3) || 8,507 || 65–57
|- bgcolor="ccffcc"
| 123 || August 23 || @ Cubs || 6–1 || Porterfield (3–5) || Phillips || — || 16,097 || 66–57
|- bgcolor="ccffcc"
| 124 || August 24 || @ Cardinals || 8–4 || Friend (17–13) || Mizell || Face (17) ||  || 67–57
|- bgcolor="ffbbbb"
| 125 || August 24 || @ Cardinals || 8–12 || Brosnan || Gross (4–5) || Wight || 25,630 || 67–58
|- bgcolor="ffbbbb"
| 126 || August 25 || @ Cardinals || 1–7 || Jackson || Kline (12–12) || — || 9,464 || 67–59
|- bgcolor="ccffcc"
| 127 || August 26 || @ Cardinals || 5–3 || Gross (5–5) || Jones || Face (18) || 13,271 || 68–59
|- bgcolor="ccffcc"
| 128 || August 27 || @ Cardinals || 14–1 || Law (10–11) || Chittum || — || 10,467 || 69–59
|- bgcolor="ccffcc"
| 129 || August 29 || @ Braves || 3–2 || Friend (18–13) || Spahn || Gross (6) || 35,642 || 70–59
|- bgcolor="ffbbbb"
| 130 || August 30 || @ Braves || 1–9 || Burdette || Raydon (7–4) || — || 28,648 || 70–60
|- bgcolor="ffbbbb"
| 131 || August 31 || @ Braves || 0–2 || Willey || Kline (12–13) || — || 32,870 || 70–61
|-

|- bgcolor="ccffcc"
| 132 || September 1 || Phillies || 5–2 || Law (11–11) || Sanford || — ||  || 71–61
|- bgcolor="ffbbbb"
| 133 || September 1 || Phillies || 0–9 || Simmons || Porterfield (3–6) || — || 25,438 || 71–62
|- bgcolor="ccffcc"
| 134 || September 2 || Phillies || 3–2 || Friend (19–13) || Cardwell || — || 9,911 || 72–62
|- bgcolor="ffbbbb"
| 135 || September 3 || @ Redlegs || 4–7 || Schmidt || Gross (5–6) || Pena || 7,917 || 72–63
|- bgcolor="ccffcc"
| 136 || September 5 || Braves || 1–0 (10) || Witt (9–2) || Willey || — || 30,319 || 73–63
|- bgcolor="ccffcc"
| 137 || September 6 || Braves || 7–6 || Smith (2–2) || Robinson || Face (19) || 23,392 || 74–63
|- bgcolor="ffbbbb"
| 138 || September 7 || Braves || 1–3 || Spahn || Kline (12–14) || — ||  || 74–64
|- bgcolor="ccffcc"
| 139 || September 7 || Braves || 4–1 || Law (12–11) || Burdette || Face (20) || 36,567 || 75–64
|- bgcolor="ccffcc"
| 140 || September 8 || Redlegs || 4–1 || Raydon (8–4) || Acker || Gross (7) || 11,577 || 76–64
|- bgcolor="ccffcc"
| 141 || September 9 || Giants || 2–1 || Face (5–2) || Jones || — || 32,250 || 77–64
|- bgcolor="ccffcc"
| 142 || September 10 || Giants || 6–4 (10) || Friend (20–13) || Grissom || — || 20,260 || 78–64
|- bgcolor="ffbbbb"
| 143 || September 12 || Dodgers || 3–7 || Craig || Kline (12–15) || — || 21,267 || 78–65
|- bgcolor="ccffcc"
| 144 || September 13 || Dodgers || 9–4 || Law (13–11) || Mauriello || Porterfield (5) || 14,259 || 79–65
|- bgcolor="ccffcc"
| 145 || September 14 || Cubs || 5–4 || Porterfield (4–6) || Hillman || Blackburn (3) ||  || 80–65
|- bgcolor="ccffcc"
| 146 || September 14 || Cubs || 6–2 || Friend (21–13) || Phillips || — || 23,160 || 81–65
|- bgcolor="ccffcc"
| 147 || September 16 || Cardinals || 3–1 || Kline (13–15) || Mabe || — || 25,977 || 82–65
|- bgcolor="ccffcc"
| 148 || September 19 || @ Phillies || 4–2 || Friend (22–13) || Cardwell || — || 8,498 || 83–65
|- bgcolor="ccffcc"
| 149 || September 20 || @ Phillies || 4–3 || Law (14–11) || Roberts || Smith (2) || 4,217 || 84–65
|- bgcolor="ffbbbb"
| 150 || September 22 || @ Phillies || 2–3 (14) || Meyer || Kline (13–16) || — ||  || 84–66
|- bgcolor="ffbbbb"
| 151 || September 22 || @ Phillies || 0–1 || Sanford || Daniels (0–3) || — || 5,605 || 84–67
|- bgcolor="ffbbbb"
| 152 || September 26 || Phillies || 2–3 || Roberts || Friend (22–14) || — || 12,000 || 84–68
|- bgcolor="ffbbbb"
| 153 || September 27 || Phillies || 3–7 || Cardwell || Law (14–12) || — || 9,104 || 84–69
|- bgcolor="ffbbbb"
| 154 || September 28 || Phillies || 4–6 (10) || Meyer || Gross (5–7) || — || 33,109 || 84–70
|-

|-
| Legend:       = Win       = LossBold = Pirates team member

Opening Day lineup

Notable transactions 
 June 15, 1958: Johnny O'Brien and Gene Freese were traded by the Pirates to the St. Louis Cardinals for Dick Schofield and cash.

Roster

Player stats

Batting

Starters by position 
Note: Pos = Position; G = Games played; AB = At bats; H = Hits; Avg. = Batting average; HR = Home runs; RBI = Runs batted in

Other batters 
Note: G = Games played; AB = At bats; H = Hits; Avg. = Batting average; HR = Home runs; RBI = Runs batted in

Pitching

Starting pitchers 
Note: G = Games pitched; IP = Innings pitched; W = Wins; L = Losses; ERA = Earned run average; SO = Strikeouts

Other pitchers 
Note: G = Games pitched; IP = Innings pitched; W = Wins; L = Losses; ERA = Earned run average; SO = Strikeouts

Relief pitchers 
Note: G = Games pitched; W = Wins; L = Losses; SV = Saves; ERA = Earned run average; SO = Strikeouts

Farm system

Notes

References 
 1958 Pittsburgh Pirates team page at Baseball Reference
 1958 Pittsburgh Pirates Page at Baseball Almanac

Pittsburgh Pirates seasons
Pittsburgh Pirates season
Pittsburg Pir